Saugus Union School District (SUSD) is a public California school district located in Santa Clarita, Los Angeles County, California. The district serves students in grades TK/K-6 in Saugus, most of Valencia, and parts of Canyon Country. There are also pre-school programs on-site at many of the schools. The district includes 15 elementary schools.

Schools
All SUSD schools are within the city of Santa Clarita, except for Tesoro del Valle, which is in unincorporated Valencia within the city's sphere of influence.

Planned schools 
Entrada Elementary School - planned school in unincorporated Valencia near Six Flags Magic Mountain, serving the new FivePoint Valencia community.

Closed schools 
Saugus Elementary School - first school in the district's history, opening in 1908 and closing in 1978. The school's bell can now been seen in the bell tower of the Metrolink station in Newhall.

Bouquet Canyon Elementary School - opened in the mid-1990s and closed in the spring of 2010. In 2021, the school reopened as Rosedell Elementary School's north campus, accommodating Rosedell's fifth- and sixth-graders.

References

External links
 

School districts in Los Angeles County, California
Education in Santa Clarita, California
1908 establishments in California
School districts established in 1908